The Bachelor of Ugliness was a title conferred onto Vanderbilt University's most popular male undergraduate. One of the highest honors that a student could achieve, it was given to the male undergraduate student believed to be most representative of ideal young manhood and the class's most popular member, devised by William H. Dodd, a professor, in 1885.

List of recipients

Many more men have been voted into this honor, such as the first African-American basketball player at Vanderbilt, Perry Wallace, who earned the title in 1970.

References

Vanderbilt University people
Student awards